The Land Transfer Act 1952 is an Act of Parliament passed in New Zealand in 1952. It implements the Torrens title system of land registration. Much of it is based on the Land Transfer Act 1885.

References

External links
The current Act as amended
The Act as enacted in 1952

Statutes of New Zealand
1952 in New Zealand law
Real property law